Verticordia chrysantha, commonly known as yellow featherflower or yellow Morrison, is a flowering plant in the myrtle family, Myrtaceae and is endemic to Western Australia. It is a small, slow-growing, rather bushy shrub with bright yellow flowers which often turn reddish-brown as they age. It is widespread in the south-west of the state.

Description

The flowers are usually scented, arranged in a corymb-like groups on the ends of the branches, bright yellow but ageing to bronze or brown, sometimes only in the centre. The petals are also bright yellow, egg-shaped,  and have long, spreading finger-like lobes. Flowering time is from September to December.

Taxonomy and naming
Verticordia chrysantha was first formally described by Stephan Endlicher in 1838 and the description was published in Stirpium Australasicarum Herbarii Hugeliani Decades Tres from specimens collected by John Gilbert in 1842. The specific epithet (chrysantha) is derived from the Ancient Greek words  meaning "gold" and anthos meaning "flower", referring to the flower colour.

When Alex George reviewed the genus Verticordia in 1991, he placed this species in subgenus Chrysoma, section Jugata along with V. chrysanthella, V. brevifolia, V. galeata, V. coronata, V. amphigia and V. laciniata.

Distribution and habitat
This verticordia grows in a wide range of soils and vegetation associations between Kalbarri in the north-west and Esperance on the south coast, although not in the far south-west corner of the state.

Conservation
Verticordia chrysantha is classified as "not threatened" by the Western Australian Government Department of Parks and Wildlife.

Use in horticulture
Verticordia chrysantha is well established in horticulture although it is generally slow growing and then needs to be replaced after 5 years. In gardens it performs best in well-drained soil in full sun and has been shown to be drought tolerant. It produces an attractive display when used in mass plantings. Burying seeds in soil for twelve months then treating with aerosol smoke has been shown to improve the rate of germination of seeds of V. chrysantha.

References

chrysantha
Endemic flora of Western Australia
Myrtales of Australia
Rosids of Western Australia
Plants described in 1838
Taxa named by Stephan Endlicher